Rattlesnake Creek is a tributary of Paint Creek,  long, in south-central Ohio in the United States. According to the Geographic Names Information System, it has also been known historically as "Rattlesnake Fork."

Rattlesnake Creek rises near South Solon in southwestern Madison County, and flows generally southeastwardly through Fayette, Clinton and Highland counties, past the town of Octa.

Parts of the creek flow through rapids;  in Highland County have been rated Class II (IV) whitewater rapids.

A USGS stream gauge on the creek at Centerfield in Highland County recorded a mean annual discharge of  during water years 1972–1981.

Gallery

See also
List of rivers of Ohio

References

External links
Paint Creek State Park website

Rivers of Ohio
Rivers of Clinton County, Ohio
Rivers of Fayette County, Ohio
Rivers of Highland County, Ohio
Rivers of Madison County, Ohio